The Free-minded National Association was a political party in Sweden. The party was in government from 1905 to 1906 and from 1911 to 1914 under the leadership of Karl Staaff, from 1917 to 1920 under the leadership of Nils Edén, from 1926 to 1928 and from 1930 to 1932 under the leadership of Carl Gustaf Ekman and briefly from August to September 1932 under the leadership of Felix Hamrin.

Established in 1902, in 1923 the party split over the issue of alcohol prohibition and the anti-ban minority formed the Liberal Party of Sweden. The two parties reunited again in 1934 as the People's Party.

Leaders
 Sixten von Friesen, 1900–1905
 Karl Staaff, 1905–1915
 Daniel Persson, 1915–1918
 Nils Edén, 1918–1924
 Carl Gustaf Ekman, 1924–1932
 Felix Hamrin, 1932–1935

See also
Liberalism and centrism in Sweden

References

1902 establishments in Sweden
1934 disestablishments in Sweden
Defunct liberal political parties
Defunct political parties in Sweden
Liberals (Sweden)
Political parties established in 1902
Political parties disestablished in 1934
Radical parties